Harpalus sinicus is a species of ground beetle in the subfamily Harpalinae. It was described by Hope in 1845.

References

sinicus
Beetles described in 1845